"Don't Call It Love" is a song first released by American singer Kim Carnes on her 1981 album Mistaken Identity. The following year it was covered by Captain and Tennille and Dusty Springfield from their albums More Than Dancing and White Heat. There is also a cover version by Venezuelan artist Jorge Aguilar recorded in 1985 on his "Siempre Juntos" album, called "Esto es Amor" with adapted lyrics sung in spanish.

Dolly Parton cover
"Don't Call It Love" was covered and released as a single by American entertainer Dolly Parton. It was released in January 1985 as the first single from the album Real Love. The song reached number 3 on the Billboard Hot Country Singles & Tracks chart. Her rendition was also an Adult Contemporary hit, reaching number 12 in the US and number seven in Canada.

Chart performance

Weekly

Year-End

References

External links
 
 

1985 singles
1981 songs
Kim Carnes songs
Captain & Tennille songs
Dusty Springfield songs
Dolly Parton songs
Songs written by Tom Snow
Songs written by Dean Pitchford
Song recordings produced by David Malloy
RCA Records singles